Thiéry may refer to:

Thiéry, Alpes-Maritimes, commune in France
Thiéry, Burkina Faso, town in West Africa
Thiery (surname)

See also
Thierry, given name and surname